Sheikh Mohammad Khalid is the acting Minister for the Propagation of Virtue and the Prevention of Vice (Minister of Dawat-wal-Irshad) of the Islamic Emirate of Afghanistan since 7 September 2021. He is an ethnic Nuristani, from Kolam village, Nuristan Province.

References

Living people
Taliban government ministers of Afghanistan
Nuristani people
Year of birth missing (living people)